Chithiram TV (சித்திரம் தொலைக்காட்சி) was an Indian Tamil-language kids television channel owned by Kalaignar TV Private Limited. The target audience are children aged between 3 and 14. It was launched on 3 June 2010. The channel aired content focused on infotainment and edutainment exclusively for children. The channel was rebranded as Blacksheep TV in 14 December 2022.

Programming
Charlie Chaplin
Wordgirl
Crazy Toy Kingdom
Sirippo Sirippu
Asterix and the Vikings
Margo the Mouse
Paz Little Penguin
Vikramaditya
Vasanthathin Party!
Vetri Veera
Kungfu Tuiju Panda
Idhu Namma School
Conch Bay
Ashley The Growth of the Monkey King
Finley the Fire Engine
Reksia
Sonic Underground
Ugly Duckling
Thirukkural Kathaigal

See also
 Kalaignar TV

References

External links
 Official Website

Tamil-language television channels
Children's television channels in India
Television channels and stations established in 2010
Television stations in Chennai
2010 establishments in Tamil Nadu
Mass media companies established in 2010
Television channels and stations disestablished in 2022